World Trade is a U.S. progressive rock band that features Billy Sherwood on bass and vocals and Bruce Gowdy on guitar. Yes's Chris Squire performed as a guest on their second album, Euphoria.

History
The band was formed with Sherwood on lead vocals and bass, Gowdy on guitars, Guy Allison on keyboards and Mark T. Williams on drums. World Trade evolved from an earlier band, Lodgic, featuring Sherwood and Allison.

Their 1989 eponymous debut was co-produced by Keith Olsen. A second album followed in 1995 on Magna Carta Records, with Williams being replaced by Jay Schellen. The album was produced by Sherwood. The band's sound had similarities to 1980s Yes and the album included two Chris Squire Experiment tracks with Squire making uncredited contributions on backing vocals. Because of the similarity between the two bands, Sherwood and Gowdy briefly worked together with Yes after vocalist Jon Anderson and guitarist/vocalist Trevor Rabin left the band. However, both returned for the album Union before any material could be recorded with Sherwood and Gowdy.

Sherwood and Schellen also recorded tracks for a series of tribute albums by Magna Carta.

Sherwood has frequently collaborated with Schellen since. In the mid-2000s, Sherwood and Gowdy began work on a new World Trade album, but this was abandoned and material is planned on a release called Psy-Op.

After the group reunited in 2016, a third album was released in 2017 from Frontiers Records, titled Unify and featuring the original line-up of Sherwood, Gowdy, Allison, and Williams.

Discography

Studio albums
 World Trade (1989)
 Euphoria (1995)
 Unify (2017)

Guest appearances
Tales from Yesterday (1995), Yes tribute album
Supper's Ready (1995), Genesis tribute album
The Moon Revisited (1995), Pink Floyd tribute album

References

Sources
Billy Sherwood discography at Yescography

American progressive rock groups
Polydor Records artists
Frontiers Records artists
Musical groups established in 1989
Magna Carta Records artists